Uruguay competed at the 2022 World Athletics Championships in Eugene, United States, from 15 to 24 July 2022. It entered 6 athletes.

Results

Men
 Track and road events

 Field events

Women
 Track and field events

References 

Nations at the 2022 World Athletics Championships
2022 in Uruguayan sport
Uruguay at the World Championships in Athletics